Ana Cláudia Scheffer Riffel (born April 18, 1996),  known by her stage name Clau, is a Brazilian singer and songwriter. She was signed to Universal Music after her popular online performances got her noticed. Her single Relaxa reached 1 million views on YouTube in less than 2 days. Clau is managed by the also Brazilian singer Anitta.

Discography

EP
#Relaxa (2018)

References

1996 births
Living people
21st-century Brazilian singers
Brazilian composers
Brazilian singer-songwriters
21st-century Brazilian women singers
Brazilian women singer-songwriters